Jessica Tuomela (born August 3, 1983) is a Canadian paralympic competitive swimmer who was born in Sault Ste. Marie, Ontario.

Although blinded by retinoblastoma at the age of three, she has succeeded in competitive swimming despite her disability. Competing at the 2000 Summer Paralympics in Sydney, Australia, Tuomela earned a silver medal in the 50-metre freestyle as well as three sixth-place finishes in the 100 freestyle, 100-meter backstroke and 200-meter medley.

Her accomplishments merited an invitation to the 2004 Paralympic Games in Athens, Greece, where she placed fourth in the 50-meter freestyle and had two sixth-place finishes in the 100-meter freestyle and 100-meter backstroke.  Tuomela also set five Canadian records in swimming. She won two gold medals in May, 2006 at the Belgian Paralympic Championships in the 50-meter breaststroke and 100-meter backstroke. She also took the silver medal in the 100-meter breaststroke. Tuomela currently resides in Scotland pursuing post-secondary activities.

In 1998 Tuomela was one of 35 young people from North America and Russia to win the "Yes I Can" award, which recognizes the accomplishments of people with disabilities.  She was honored in Sault Ste. Marie in 1992 for her academic achievements. On September 30, 2006, Tuomela became one of the first ten inductees in the Sault Ste. Marie Walk of Fame.

In June 2022, Tuomela and guide Emma Skaug were named to Canada's 2022 Commonwealth Games team.

References

Swimming Canada news story on Jessica Tuomela
Sootoday.com news story on Jessica Tuomela
Sootoday.com news story on Sault Ste. Marie Walk of Fame inductees

1983 births
Living people
Swimmers at the 2000 Summer Paralympics
Swimmers at the 2004 Summer Paralympics
Swimmers at the 2008 Summer Paralympics
Paralympic swimmers of Canada
Paralympic silver medalists for Canada
Sportspeople from Sault Ste. Marie, Ontario
Canadian blind people
Medalists at the 2000 Summer Paralympics
Canadian people of Finnish descent
Paralympic medalists in swimming
Canadian female freestyle swimmers
Canadian female backstroke swimmers
Canadian female breaststroke swimmers
S11-classified Paralympic swimmers
20th-century Canadian women
21st-century Canadian women
Canadian female triathletes
Commonwealth Games bronze medallists for Canada
Commonwealth Games medallists in triathlon
Triathletes at the 2022 Commonwealth Games
Medallists at the 2022 Commonwealth Games